The Australian electricity sector has been historically dominated by coal-fired power stations, but renewables are forming a rapidly growing fraction of supply.

Due to its large size and the location of its population, Australia lacks a single grid that covers all states, but has a transmission grid that extends along the east coast from Queensland via New South Wales and Victoria to South Australia and also connects via submarine DC cable with Tasmania.

Since 2005, wind power and rooftop solar have led to a fast growing share of renewable energy in total electricity generation. Generation from renewable sources reached a share of 32.5 per cent in 2021, an increase from 16.9 per cent in 2017.

Statistical summary 

 Notes
Percentages of installed capacity and electricity generation, "other dispatched" not included.

 Notes
"Solar" includes rooftop solar and solar farms, "other dispatched" (max 1.2 TWh) and "battery storage" (max 70 GWh) not included.

Electricity supply 
As of 2011, electricity producers in Australia were not building gas-fired power stations, while the four major banks were unwilling to make loans for coal-fired power stations, according to EnergyAustralia (formerly TRUenergy). In 2014, an oversupply of generation was expected to persist until 2024. However, a report published in 2017 by the Australian Energy Market Operator projected that energy supply in 2018 and 2019 is expected to meet demands, with a risk of supply falling short at peak demand times.

From 2003 to 2013 real electric prices for households increased by an average of 72%. Much of this increase in price has been attributed to over-investment in increasing distribution networks and capacity, and environmental policy impacts. Further price increases are predicted to be moderate over the next few years (2017 on) due to changes in the regulation of transmission and distribution networks as well as increased competition in electricity wholesale markets as supply and demand merge.

Privatisation 
Since the 1990s the electricity sector in Australia has seen a wave of privatisation. First in South Australia in 1999, then in Victoria in the late 1990s, then in New South Wales in the early 2010s.

In 2006, the Queensland Government announced plans to privatise the retail arm of Energex and its Allgas distribution network.

Renewables 

Renewable energy has potential in Australia, and the Climate Change Authority is reviewing the 20-percent Renewable Energy Target (RET). The production of 50 megawatts of wind power (power for nearly 21,000 homes annually) creates about 50 construction jobs and five staff positions. Renewable energy in Australia includes wind power, hydroelectricity, solar PV, heat pumps, geothermal, wave and solar thermal energy. In recent years, wind and solar power have been the fastest growing source of energy in Australia.

Renewable electricity in Australia is available from a number of green energy suppliers that supply electricity from environmentally friendly energy sources that are renewable and non-polluting. The growth and development of the green energy industry was tracked in Australia by the ALTEX-Australia alternative energy index from 2006 to 2011.

In 2021, Australia produced 74,679 gigawatt-hours of renewable energy, which accounted for 32.5% of electricity production, which represented an increase of almost 5 percentage points compared to 2020. In the five years prior, the proportion of Australia's electricity that comes from renewables has almost doubled, increasing from 16.9 per cent in 2017 to 32.5 per cent in 2021.

In Australia renewable energy is accredited under the GreenPower scheme whereby all distributors are government audited bi-annually to ensure that customers are getting exactly what is described in their purchased products. In the 2009 settlement period there were 904,716 GreenPower customers Australia-wide, accounting for a total of 2,194,934 MWh of electricity generation, a 10% increase over 2008. This total electricity provision was divided between  residential customers who purchased 1,001,195 MWh, and business customers who purchased 1,193,739 MWh. The largest nationwide distributors were EnergyAustralia, Origin Energy, and TRUenergy.

By the 2014 settlement period the number of GreenPower customers Australia-wide was at 497,406, and total purchases accounted for 1,279,281 MWh.

Hydropower has been the main renewable source for decades. The 3.8 GW Snowy Mountains Scheme and the 2.6 GW Hydro Tasmania are the largest facilities.

Wind power 

Wind power is a mode of production of renewable energy in Australia. Wind power is a rapidly expanding mode of renewable energy production in Australia with an average annual rate of growth in installed capacity of 35% over the five years up to 2011. As of December 2017, there were 4,455 megawatts (MW) of installed capacity and a further 18,823 MW of capacity was proposed or committed. In 2016, wind power accounted for 5.3% of Australia's total electricity demand and 30.8% of total renewable energy supply. At the end of 2016 there were 79 wind farms in Australia, most of which had turbines from 1.5 to 3 MW. In addition, 16 projects with a combined installed capacity of 1,861 MW are either under construction, constructed or will start construction in 2017 having reached financial closure.

Wind power in South Australia has 36.9% of Australia's wind power capacity, accounting for 40% of the state's electricity needs as of 2016 and the first year in which wind power was the leading source of electricity in the state. By the end of 2011 wind power in South Australia reached 26% of the State's electricity generation, edging out coal-fired power for the first time. At that stage South Australia, with only 7.2% of Australia's population, had 54% of Australia's installed wind capacity.

Victoria also has a substantial system, with just under 30% of the Australia's capacity as of 2016. In August 2015, the Victorian government announced financial backing for new wind farms as part of a push to encourage renewable energy in the state, which was expected to bring forward the building of a modest 100 MW of new wind energy in the state, worth $200 million in investment. The government expected that there were about 2400 MW worth of Victorian projects that had been approved but were yet to be built.

Solar power in Australia 

Solar power in Australia is a growing industry. As of December 2017, Australia had over 7,024 MW of installed photovoltaic (PV) solar power, of which 1,190 MW were installed in the preceding 12 months. In 2017, 23 solar PV projects with a combined installed capacity of 2,034 MW were either under construction, constructed or due to start construction having reached financial closure. PV accounted for 2.4% of Australia's electrical energy production in 2014/15.

Feed-in tariffs and renewable energy targets designed to assist renewable energy commercialisation in Australia have largely been responsible for the rapid increase. In South Australia, a solar feed-in tariff was introduced for households and an educational program that involved installing PVs on the roofs of major public buildings such as the Adelaide Airport, State Parliament, Museum, Art Gallery and several hundred public schools. In 2008 Premier Mike Rann announced funding for $8 million worth of solar panels on the roof of the new Goyder Pavilion at the Royal Adelaide Showgrounds, the largest rooftop solar installation in Australia, qualifying it for official "power station" status.  South Australia has the highest per capita take up of household solar power in Australia.

The installed PV capacity in Australia has increased 10-fold between 2009 and 2011, and quadrupled between 2011 and 2016.
The first commercial-scale PV power plant, the 1 MW Uterne Solar Power Station, was opened in 2011.
Greenough River Solar Farm opened in 2012 with a capacity of 10 MW.
The price of photovoltaics has been decreasing, and in January 2013, was less than half the cost of using grid electricity in Australia.

Australia has been internationally criticised in the past for producing very little of its energy from solar power, despite its vast resources, extensive sunshine and overall high potential.
As they became the world leader in solar energy per capita in 2019, this criticism has ceased.

Storage 
The main power storage in Australia is the 600 MW Tumut 3 pumped-storage hydroelectricity.

Battery 
Since 2017, Australia has built several grid-scale batteries, mostly lithium-ion. The batteries are made to perform various functions for particular local purposes, with significant differences, particularly the energy capacity. Most batteries perform grid services.

Some parts of the Australian grid are thinly connected and local outages have been common. The mining industry installs batteries to reduce fuel consumption.

Planned or under construction 

In Southern Australia a battery installation was performed to keep the local grid running until backup power could be bought on line. the Hornsdale Power Reserve is a grid-connected energy storage system co-located with the Hornsdale Wind Farm in the Mid North region of South Australia.
It is promoted as the largest lithium-ion battery in the world.

During 2017 Tesla, Inc. won the contract and built the Hornsdale Power Reserve, for a capital cost of A$90 million, leading to the colloquial Tesla big battery name.

In November 2019, Neoen confirmed that it was increasing capacity by a further 50MW/64.5MWh to a combined 185 MWh. The increased storage capacity was installed by 23 March 2020, and the increased power will follow later in the year.

National Electricity Market 

The National Electricity Market (NEM) is an arrangement in Australia for the connection of the synchronous electricity transmission grids of the eastern and southern Australia states and territories to create a cross-state wholesale electricity market. The Australian Energy Market Commission develops and maintains the Australian National Electricity Rules (NER), which have the force of law in the states and territories participating in NEM. The Rules are enforced by the Australian Energy Regulator. The day-to-day management of NEM is performed by the Australian Energy Market Operator.

The NEM began operation on 13 December 1998 and operations currently includes Queensland, New South Wales, Australian Capital Territory, Victoria, Tasmania and South Australia. Western Australia and the Northern Territory are not connected to the NEM. The NEM comprises five regions, with the ACT being in the NSW region. Tasmania joined the NEM in May 2005 and became fully operational on 29 April 2006 when the Basslink interconnector was fully activated. The Snowy region was abolished as a region on 1 July 2008 and the components split between New South Wales and Victoria. The Northern Territory has adopted parts of the National Electricity Law, with the Australian Energy Market Commission becoming the rule maker for the Territory for parts of the National Electricity Rules from 1 July 2016. Western Australia is also considering adopting parts of the NER.

The NEM operates the world's longest interconnected power systems between Port Douglas, Queensland and Port Lincoln, South Australia with an end-to-end distance of more than 5000 kilometres, and 40,000 circuit kilometres. Over A$11 billion of electricity is traded annually in the NEM to meet the demand of almost 19 million end-use consumers. New South Wales accounts for about 25% of NEM.

States and territories

Queensland 

Queensland, Australia's second largest state in terms of physical area (Western Australia is the largest), achieved the early leaders' dream of providing electricity to every home entailing a considerable degree of pioneering, innovation, and commitment. Queensland proved to be a pioneer in the supply of electricity in Australia, with the first public demonstration in Australia, the first recorded use for public purposes in the country, the first Parliament House in Australia and the first commercial operations in Australia all occurring in Brisbane.

Generation and limited distribution was initially the responsibility of local authorities, until a central state-based authority to coordinate the generation and distribution of electrical power was established in 1938. In the late 1990s, the electricity sector was restructured to enable integration with the National Electricity Market (NEM).

The history of power generation and distribution in Queensland can be considered in three major phases: Initial local generation and distribution; creation of a statewide body and the consequent creation of an extensive network; and the restructure to enable integration with the NEM.

Queensland is the most decentralised mainland state, and initial local generation and distribution was the only viable option for the supply of electricity in many instances. The creation of regional, and then a statewide network from 1945 enabled economies of scale and reliability to be obtained, particularly by generating plants. Within a decade of the statewide network being completed, the establishment of the NEM provided new commercial opportunities for generators and improved reliability of supply.

Victoria

South Australia 

South Australia is rich in energy. It contains significant reserves of fossil fuels such as natural gas, coal, and oil – although there are incentives to phase these out in favour of clean energy. The state also contains large amounts of uranium, including the world's single biggest deposit at Olympic Dam, which represents 30% of the world's total resource.

The State has seen a rapid increase in investment in renewable energy, and was the leading producer of wind power in Australia in 2011. South Australia has been noted for the availability of hot rocks suitable for geothermal electricity generation. The South Australian Government has released plans to make South Australia a green energy hub for Australia's eastern seaboard. During 2020, the state set new records for its lowest (379 MW) and highest (2,576 MW) grid power. Prices also fell, and were negative 10% of the time in the third quarter, but by a smaller amount than previously. This mainly occurred in September, when solar farms paid to supply power. Curtailment was 5.5%, mainly in the daytime. In October 2020, South Australia exceeded 100% of the state's electricity demand using solar power for the first time.

Tasmania 

A large proportion of Tasmania's power is produced by hydro-electric means. There are also a number of wind farms producing electricity. An underwater power cable,  links Tasmania to mainland Australia. This connection was established in 2005. It allows for surplus electricity to be sold into the national grid. Alternatively electricity supply can also be imported if needed. The vast majority of the states power supply is classified as green energy.

Western Australia 
Western Australia has its own grid the South West Interconnected System which is not connected to the rest of country due to distance.

Northern Territory 
The Northern Territory has multiple grids, which are predominately run by two government owned companies, Power and Water Corporation and Territory Generation.

Energy efficiency 
Lower energy use could save A$25 billion, or A$840 per electricity customer, according to EnergyAustralia.

References 

Electric power in Australia